Ampelocissus barbata is a species of liana in the grape family Vitaceae. It was originally described from Sylhet (now in Bangladesh) by Nathaniel Wallich and placed in the genus Vitis. The species was moved to Ampelocissus by Jules Émile Planchon in 1884.

References

External links

barbata
Flora of Bangladesh
Flora of India (region)
Flora of Myanmar